Edward “Eddie” Allen is an American football coach and former player.He currently is a special teams assistant for Rutgers. He previously was recently the Special Teams Coordinator at the University of Connecticut. He has coordinated special teams for the majority of his coaching career. Before UConn, Allen had coaching stops at Hofstra, Fort Scott Community College, Rutgers, Rhode Island, and Delaware.

Coaching career

Allen got his coaching start in 2003 as a graduate assistant and video coordinator at Hofstra.

In 2004, Allen coached the wide receivers at Fort Scott Community College.

The next three years, 2005–2007, Allen was on Greg Schiano’s staff at Rutgers. In 05 and 06, Allen worked as a player development assistant, before moving into a graduate assistant role in 2007.

From 2008 to 2013, Allen was in charge of the special teams for Rhode Island.

From 2014 to 2017, Allen was the Special Teams Coordinator and tight ends coach. While there, he helped develop All-American tight end and Baltimore Ravens draft selection, Nick Boyle.

In February 2018, UConn Head Coach Randy Edsall announced Eddie Allen as his new special teams coordinator. He was paid $165,000 annually.

Playing career

Allen played quarterback for the New Haven Chargers, an NCAA Division II school in West Haven, Connecticut. He was a four-year letterwinner for head coach and offensive coordinator, and former Miami Dolphins and Oakland Raiders head coach, Tony Sparano.

Personal life

Allen and his wife, Kristin, have three children, daughter, Makayla, and sons Austin and Jackson.

References

Living people
American football quarterbacks
Year of birth missing (living people)
Delaware Fightin' Blue Hens football coaches
Fort Scott Greyhounds football coaches
Hofstra Pride football coaches
New Haven Chargers football players
Rhode Island Rams football coaches
Rutgers Scarlet Knights football coaches
UConn Huskies football coaches